In mathematics, particularly in functional analysis, the spectrum of a bounded linear operator (or, more generally, an unbounded linear operator) is a generalisation of the set of eigenvalues of a matrix.  Specifically, a complex number  is said to be in the spectrum of a bounded linear operator  if 

 either has no set-theoretic inverse;
 or the set-theoretic inverse is either unbounded or defined on a non-dense subset.

Here,  is the identity operator.

The study of spectra and related properties is known as spectral theory, which has numerous applications, most notably the mathematical formulation of quantum mechanics.

The spectrum of an operator on a finite-dimensional vector space is precisely the set of eigenvalues.  However an operator on an infinite-dimensional space may have additional elements in its spectrum, and may have no eigenvalues.  For example, consider the right shift operator R on the Hilbert space ℓ2,

This has no eigenvalues, since if Rx=λx then by expanding this expression we see that x1=0, x2=0, etc.  On the other hand, 0 is in the spectrum because although the operator R − 0 (i.e. R itself) is invertible, the inverse is defined on a set which is not dense in ℓ2. In fact every bounded linear operator on a complex Banach space must have a non-empty spectrum.

The notion of spectrum extends to unbounded (i.e. not necessarily bounded) operators. A complex number λ is said to be in the spectrum of an unbounded operator  defined on domain  if there is no bounded inverse  defined on the whole of   If T is closed (which includes the case when T is bounded), boundedness of  follows automatically from its existence.

The space of bounded linear operators B(X) on a Banach space X is an example of a unital Banach algebra.  Since the definition of the spectrum does not mention any properties of B(X) except those that any such algebra has, the notion of a spectrum may be generalised to this context by using the same definition verbatim.

Spectrum of a bounded operator

Definition

Since  is a linear operator, the inverse is linear if it exists; and, by the bounded inverse theorem, it is bounded.

The spectrum of a given operator  is often denoted , and its complement, the resolvent set, is denoted . ( is sometimes used to denote the spectral radius of )

Relation to eigenvalues

However, the converse statement is not true: the operator  may not have an inverse, even if  is not an eigenvalue. Thus the spectrum of an operator always contains all its eigenvalues, but is not limited to them.

For example, consider the Hilbert space , that consists of all bi-infinite sequences of real numbers

that have a finite sum of squares . The bilateral shift operator  simply displaces every element of the sequence by one position; namely if  then  for every integer . The eigenvalue equation  has no nonzero solution in this space, since it implies that all the values  have the same absolute value (if ) or are a geometric progression (if ); either way, the sum of their squares would not be finite. However, the operator  is not invertible if .

Basic properties 

The spectrum of a bounded operator T is always a closed, bounded and non-empty subset of the complex plane.

If the spectrum were empty, then the resolvent function

would be defined everywhere on the complex plane and bounded. But it can be shown that the resolvent function R is holomorphic on its domain. By the vector-valued version of Liouville's theorem, this function is constant, thus everywhere zero as it is zero at infinity. This would be a contradiction.

The boundedness of the spectrum follows from the Neumann series expansion in λ; the spectrum σ(T) is bounded by ||T||. A similar result shows the closedness of the spectrum.

The bound ||T|| on the spectrum can be refined somewhat. The spectral radius, r(T), of T is the radius of the smallest circle in the complex plane which is centered at the origin and contains the spectrum σ(T) inside of it, i.e.

The spectral radius formula says that for any element  of a Banach algebra,

Spectrum of an unbounded operator 

One can extend the definition of spectrum to unbounded operators on a Banach space X. These operators which are no longer elements in the Banach algebra B(X).

Definition
Let X be a Banach space and  be a linear operator defined on domain .
A complex number λ is said to be in the resolvent set (also called regular set) of  if the operator

has a bounded everywhere-defined inverse, i.e. if there exists a bounded operator

such that

A complex number λ is then in the spectrum if λ is not in the resolvent set.

For λ to be in the resolvent (i.e. not in the spectrum), just like in the bounded case,  must be bijective, since it must have a two-sided inverse. As before, if an inverse exists, then its linearity is immediate, but in general it may not be bounded, so this condition must be checked separately.

By the closed graph theorem, boundedness of  does follow directly from its existence when T is closed.  Then, just as in the bounded case, a complex number λ lies in the spectrum of a closed operator T if and only if  is not bijective.  Note that the class of closed operators includes all bounded operators.

Basic properties

The spectrum of an unbounded operator is in general a closed, possibly empty, subset of the complex plane.
If the operator T is not closed, then .

Classification of points in the spectrum 

Accordingly, the spectrum of T can be divided into the following parts:

  if  is not bounded below. In particular, this is the case if  is not injective, that is, λ is an eigenvalue. The set of eigenvalues is called the point spectrum of T and denoted by σp(T). Alternatively,  could be one-to-one but still not bounded below. Such λ is not an eigenvalue but still an approximate eigenvalue of T (eigenvalues themselves are also approximate eigenvalues). The set of approximate eigenvalues (which includes the point spectrum) is called the approximate point spectrum of T, denoted by σap(T).
  if  does not have dense range.

Note that the approximate point spectrum and residual spectrum are not necessarily disjoint (however, the point spectrum and the residual spectrum are).

The following subsections provide more details on the three parts of σ(T) sketched above.

Point spectrum

If an operator is not injective (so there is some nonzero x with T(x) = 0), then it is clearly not invertible. So if λ is an eigenvalue of T, one necessarily has λ ∈ σ(T). The set of eigenvalues of T is also called the point spectrum of T, denoted by σp(T).

Approximate point spectrum

More generally, by the bounded inverse theorem, T is not invertible if it is not bounded below; that is, if there is no c > 0 such that ||Tx|| ≥ c||x|| for all .  So the spectrum includes the set of approximate eigenvalues, which are those λ such that  is not bounded below; equivalently, it is the set of λ for which there is a sequence of unit vectors x1, x2, ... for which

.

It is easy to see that the eigenvalues lie in the approximate point spectrum.

For example, consider the right shift R on  defined by

Direct calculation shows R has no eigenvalues, but every λ with |λ| = 1 is an approximate eigenvalue; letting xn be the vector

one can see that ||xn|| = 1 for all n, but

Since R is a unitary operator, its spectrum lies on the unit circle. Therefore, the approximate point spectrum of R is its entire spectrum.

This conclusion is also true for a more general class of operators.
A unitary operator is normal. By the spectral theorem, a bounded operator on a Hilbert space H is normal if and only if it is equivalent (after identification of H with an  space) to a multiplication operator. It can be shown that the approximate point spectrum of a bounded multiplication operator equals its spectrum.

Continuous spectrum

The continuous spectrum therefore consists of those approximate eigenvalues which are not eigenvalues and do not lie in the residual spectrum. That is,

.

For example, is injective and has a dense range, yet .
Indeed, if  with  such that , one does not necessarily have , and then .

Compression spectrum

Residual spectrum

An operator may be injective, even bounded below, but still not invertible. This shift operator is an isometry, therefore bounded below by 1. But it is not invertible as it is not surjective, and moreover  is not dense in 
().

Peripheral spectrum

The peripheral spectrum of an operator is defined as the set of points in its spectrum which have modulus equal to its spectral radius.

Discrete spectrum

The discrete spectrum is defined as the set of normal eigenvalues. Equivalently, it can be characterized as the set of isolated points of the spectrum such that the corresponding Riesz projector is of finite rank.

Essential spectrum

There are five similar definitions of the essential spectrum of closed densely defined linear operator  which satisfy

All these spectra , coincide in the case of self-adjoint operators.

 The essential spectrum  is defined as the set of points  of the spectrum such that  is not semi-Fredholm. (The operator is semi-Fredholm if its range is closed and either its kernel or cokernel (or both) is finite-dimensional.)
 The essential spectrum  is defined as the set of points  of the spectrum such that the operator either  has infinite-dimensional kernel or has a range which is not closed. It can also be characterized in terms of Weyl's criterion: there exists a sequence  in the space X such that ,  and such that  contains no convergent subsequence. Such a sequence is called a singular sequence (or a singular Weyl sequence).Example:  for the operator ,  if j is even and  when j is odd (kernel is infinite-dimensional; cokernel is zero-dimensional). Note that .
 The essential spectrum  is defined as the set of points  of the spectrum such that  is not Fredholm. (The operator is Fredholm if its range is closed and both its kernel and cokernel are finite-dimensional.) Example:  for the operator ,  (kernel is zero-dimensional, cokernel is infinite-dimensional). Note that .
 The essential spectrum  is defined as the set of points  of the spectrum such that  is not Fredholm of index zero. It could also be characterized as the largest part of the spectrum of A which is preserved by compact perturbations. Note that .
Since , one has . The component  has no intersection with the resolvent set; by definition, .

Example: Hydrogen atom

The hydrogen atom provides an example of different types of the spectra. Their corresponding eigenfunctions are called eigenstates, or the bound states.

Spectrum of the adjoint operator

Let X be a Banach space and  a closed linear operator with dense domain .

We also get   by the following argument: X embeds isometrically into X**. 
Thus  can not be dense.

Furthermore, if X is reflexive, we have .

Spectra of particular classes of operators

Compact operators

If T is a compact operator, or, more generally, an inessential operator, then it can be shown that the spectrum is countable, that zero is the only possible accumulation point, and that any nonzero λ in the spectrum is an eigenvalue.

Quasinilpotent operators

Such operators could equivalently be characterized by the condition

Self-adjoint operators

If X is a Hilbert space and T is a self-adjoint operator (or, more generally, a normal operator), then a remarkable result known as the spectral theorem gives an analogue of the diagonalisation theorem for normal finite-dimensional operators (Hermitian matrices, for example).

For self-adjoint operators, one can use spectral measures to define a decomposition of the spectrum into absolutely continuous, pure point, and singular parts.

Spectrum of a real operator 

The definitions of the resolvent and spectrum can be extended to any continuous linear operator  acting on a Banach space  over the real field  (instead of the complex field ) via its complexification . In this case we define the resolvent set  as the set of all  such that  is invertible as an operator acting on the complexified space ; then we define .

Real spectrum 

In this case we have . Note that the real spectrum may or may not coincide with the complex spectrum. In particular, the real spectrum could be empty.

Spectrum of a unital Banach algebra 

Let B be a complex Banach algebra containing a unit e. Then we define the spectrum σ(x) (or more explicitly σB(x)) of an element x of B to be the set of those complex numbers λ for which λe − x is not invertible in  B.  This extends the definition for bounded linear operators B(X) on a Banach space X, since B(X) is a unital Banach algebra.

See also
Essential spectrum
Discrete spectrum (mathematics)
Self-adjoint operator
Pseudospectrum
Resolvent set

References 

 Dales et al., Introduction to Banach Algebras, Operators, and Harmonic Analysis, 
 

Spectral theory